Acanthobdella is a genus of annelids belonging to the family Acanthobdellidae.

The species of this genus are found in Europe and North America.

Species:

Acanthobdella livanowi 
Acanthobdella peledina

References

Annelids